National communism represents various forms in which Marxism–Leninism and socialism has been adopted and/or implemented by leaders in different countries using aspects of nationalism or national identity to form a policy independent from communist internationalism. National communism has been used to describe movements and governments that have sought to form a distinctly unique variant of communism based upon distinct national characteristics and circumstances, rather than following policies set by other socialist states, such as the Soviet Union.

In each independent state, empire, or dependency, the relationship between social class and nation had its own particularities. The Ukrainian communists Vasil Shakhrai and Mazlakh, and then Muslim Sultan Galiyev, considered the interests of the Bolshevik Russian state at odds with those of their countries. Communist parties that have attempted to pursue independent foreign and domestic policies that conflicted with the interests of the Soviet Union have been described as examples of national communism; this form of national communism differs from communist parties/movements that embrace nationalist rhetoric. Examples include Josip Broz Tito and his independent direction that led Yugoslavia away from the Soviet Union, Imre Nagy's anti-Soviet progressive socialism, Alexander Dubček's socialism with a human face, and János Kádár's Goulash Communism.

Communist parties that have sought to follow their own variant of communism by combining communist/socialist ideals with nationalism have been described as national communist. These include the Socialist Republic of Romania under Nicolae Ceaușescu, the Democratic Kampuchea under Pol Pot, and North Korea under Juche.

Communism as Karl Marx and Friedrich Engels envisioned it was meant to be internationalist, as proletarian internationalism was expected to place class conflict well ahead of nationalism as a priority for the working class. Nationalism was often seen as a tool that the bourgeoisie used to divide and rule the proletariat (bourgeois nationalism) and prevent them from uniting against the ruling class. Whereas the influence of international communism was very strong from the late 19th century through the 1920s, the decades after that—beginning with socialism in one country and progressing into the Cold War and the Non-Aligned Movement, made national communism a larger political reality.

Origins

19th century 
During the decade of the 1840s, communist came into general use to describe those who hailed the left-wing of the Jacobin Club of the French Revolution as their ideological forefathers. In 1847, the Communist League was founded in London. The League asked Marx and Engels to draft The Communist Manifesto, which was adopted by the league and published in 1848. The Communist Manifesto included a number of views of the role of the nation in the implementation of the manifesto. The preamble says that The Communist Manifesto arose from Europeans from various nations coming together in London to publish their shared views, aims, and tendencies. Chapter one then discusses how the rise of the bourgeoisie has led to globalization and the place of national issues.

In Marxism and the Muslim World, Maxime Rodinson wrote: "Classical Marxism, for once faithful to Marx himself, postulates that a socialist state cannot be imperialist. But no proof is provided to support this thesis." According to Roman Rozdolsky: "When the Manifesto says that the workers 'have no country', this refers to the bourgeois national state, not to nationality in the ethnical sense. The workers 'have no country' because according to Marx and Engels, they must regard the bourgeois national state as a machinery for their oppression and after they have achieved power they will likewise have 'no country' in the political sense, inasmuch as the separate socialist national states will be only a transitional stage on the way to the classless and stateless society of the future, since the construction of such a society is possibly only on the international scale."

20th century 
Milovan Đilas popularized the term "national communism" in his New Class (1957), where he wrote: "No single form of communism ... exists in any other way than as national communism. In order to maintain itself it must become national." A few years earlier, ex-communist Manabendra Roy said: "Communism in Asia is essentially nationalism painted Red." Anton Pannekoek, a Dutch left communist, and Russian monarchists Nicholas Ustrialov and Vasilii Shulgin stated in 1920 that Russians first nationalized communism. They drew attention to how far the Bolsheviks differed from all other European social democratic parties in terms of structure and ideology and to the fact Vladimir Lenin's Bolshevik Party (formed from the left-wing of the Russian Social-Democratic Labour Party) can be considered the first national communist party. In March 1918, Lenin renamed his party the Russian Communist Party. National communism also refers to non-Russian communist currents that arose in the former tsarist empire after Lenin seized power in the October Revolution (1917) and to the various communist regimes that emerged after 1945 in other parts of the world.

In the wake of their Russian counterparts, left-wing socialists in Ukraine and the Muslim areas of the former Russian Empire also developed distinct variants of communism that continued in the Soviet Union until 1928. Ukrainian and Muslim variants differed from each other on two points in particular. The Muslims believed the fate of world revolution depended on events in Asia and not Europe. They also argued alliances with the national bourgeoisie were necessary for the duration of the liberation struggle. Class divisions had to be ignored, otherwise the national bourgeoisie would turn away from national liberation, ally with their imperial counterparts and thus ensure the ultimate collapse of any revolutionary struggle and national liberation. In its Muslim variant, it was a synthesis of nationalism, communism and anarchism as well as religion. Muslim communists included people from groups which predated the Russian Revolution, joining the Russian Bolshevik Party between 1917 and 1920—some of whom later were Narkomnats under Joseph Stalin, the People's Commissar.

The term "national communism" was adopted by a small number of French fascists, such as politician Pierre Clémenti. The French National-Communist Party existed between 1934–1944 and espoused a national-communist platform noted for its similarities with fascism, and popularized racial antisemitism. The group was also noted for its agitation in support of pan-European nationalism and rattachism, maintaining contacts in both Nazi Germany and Wallonia. Later, the party would drop National-Communist from its name, renaming itself the French National-Collectivist Party.

The Murba Party was an Indonesian political party that proclaimed itself to be national communist. Historian Herbert Feith labelled the profile of the party as "extreme nationalism and messianic social radicalism (whose inchoateness was only mildly tempered by the Marxist and Leninist theory to which it laid claim), it was a citadel of 'oppositionism', the politics of refusing to recognize the practical difficulties of governments'."

History

In Ukraine (1918–1920) 
In 1918, the book Do Khvyli (translated into English as On The Current Situation in the Ukraine, as edited by P. Potichnyj in 1970), written by the Ukrainian communists Serhii Mazlakh and Vasyl' Shakhrai, challenged what they saw as Russian domination over Ukraine under Bolshevik rule. The precursors of the Ukrainian communists, the Ukrainian left-social democrats in March 1919 tried to direct the mass anti-Bolshevik uprising that began then in Ukraine but failed to win control over a sizable territory. Their main military force under Danylo Zeleny was defeated by July 1919. Faced with Anton Denikin's successful offensive, they decided to stop further military activity and ally with the Bolsheviks as the lesser evil. In January 1920, they formed the Ukrainian Communist Party, which recognized Russian Communist rule over Soviet Ukraine but criticized Bolshevik administrative, cultural, political, party, and economic centralization. In a letter submitted to the Third International that year, they extended the analysis of Shakhrai and Mazlakh.

In Muslim regions of the former Russian Empire (1919–1923) 

Open conflict between prominent Muslim theorists, such as Mirsäyet Soltanğäliev on the one hand and Lenin and Stalin on the other, broke out in 1919 at the Second Congress of the Communist International over the autonomy of the Muslim Communist Party, as well as at the Congress of the Peoples of the East and the First Conference of the Turkic Peoples' Communists of Soviet Russia, and significantly at the Tenth Congress of the Bolshevik Party (April 1921). The crisis resulted in the purge of the Communist Party of Turkestan in December 1922 and the arrest of Sultan Galiev in 1923. Galiev was the first Bolshevik Party member to be arrested by Stalin. The immediate cause of his arrest were his comments on the 12th Congress resolutions regarding concessions to non-Russians. Stalin was infuriated that Galiev rejected his juxtaposition of great-power chauvinism with local nationalism. Galiev commented that reaction to great-power chauvinism was not nationalism, and it was simply reaction to great-power chauvinism. Nine days later, he was arrested.

During this time, Soltanğäliev, Turar Ryskulov, Nariman Narimanov, and Ahmet Baytursunov were very influential, especially through the Communist University of the Toilers of the East, which opened in 1921 and was very active until its staff was purged in 1924. Communists from outside the Soviet Union, such as Manabendra Nath Roy, Henk Sneevliet, and Sultan Zade, also taught there, formulating similar political positions. Students of the university included Sen Katayama, Tan Malaka, Liu Shaoqi, and Ho Chi Minh.

The great purge in the Muslim republics began in 1928 with executions of Veli İbraimov of the Tatar Communist Party and Milliy Firqa followed by the leaders of Hummet, the Tatar Communist Party, and the Tatar Union of the Godless. It also happened in Azerbaijan, Kazakhstan, and the Young Bukharians.

In Romania (1960s–1980s) 

Although the term "national communism" was never officially used by the Romanian Communist Party, it has been used to describe the ideology of the Socialist Republic of Romania between the early 1960s and 1989. Gheorghe Gheorghiu-Dej originally developed an emphasis on Romanian nationalism when attempted to pursue a more autonomous domestic and foreign policy independent from the Soviet Union. This culminated in 1964 when Gheorghiu-Dej announced a "declaration of independence", abandoning communist internationalism. Gheorghiu-Dej's successor, Nicolae Ceaușescu, developed this further by combining both Marxist–Leninist principles and doctrines of far-right nationalism. In 1971, through his July Theses manifesto, Ceaușescu declared a national cultural revolution. National communism in Romania was built around Ceaușescu's cult of personality and the idealization of Romanian history, also known as protochronism. The main argument of the tenet was the endless and unanimous fighting throughout two thousand years to achieve unity and independence.

Part of Romanian national communism was the rehabilitation of Romanian historical figures who had previously been denounced by the communist regime. Examples include the nationalist historian Nicolae Iorga and Ion Antonescu, a fascist Conducător. These figures were deemed as Romanian patriots despite their strong anti-communist views.

In Vietnam 

Since the 1930s, when the Vietnamese Communist Party was founded, many nationalists decided to join the party. This is remarkable because it marks the fact that nationalism has been recrystallized into an organized system rather than as individual struggle movements as before. On the other hand, nationalism in Vietnam has existed for a long time, even clinging to many different types of political institutions, from feudal states to one-party states. Thus, unlike communist parties or other left-wing parties, the Communist Party of Vietnam is a nationalist party in nature, with Ho Chi Minh Thought often regarded as the main ideology of the party. This may have enabled the party to attract the support of the Vietnamese people.

See also 
 Left-wing nationalism
 Socialist patriotism

References

Bibliography 
 Bennigsen, A., Muslim national communism in the Soviet Union : a revolutionary strategy for the colonial world (1979).
 
 Gizzatullin H. G., D.R., Sharafutdinov D.R., eds., Mirsaid Sultan-Galiev. Izbrannye trudy (Moscow, 1998).
 Mace, J., Communism and the dilemmas of national liberation : national communism in Soviet Ukraine, 1918-1933 (1983).
 
 Rosdolsky,R., 'The Workers and the Fatherland: A Note on a Passage in the "Communist Manifesto"', International (London) 4.2 (Winter 1977)
 Velychenko S., "Ukrainian anticolonialist Thought in Comparative Perspective," AB IMPERIO no. 4 (2012)
 idem, Painting Imperialism and Nationalism Red. The Ukrainian Marxist Critique of Russian Communist Rule in Ukraine (1918-1925) (Toronto, 2015)

External links 
 "Documentary examines failure of the 'national Communists'". 26 July 2020. Public Broadcasting of Latvia.

 
Communism
Far-left politics
Left-wing nationalism
Soviet Central Asia
Soviet internal politics
Types of socialism